Joseph Gilroy (born 19 October 1941) is a Scottish former football forward.

Joe Gilroy began his career with Queens Park, where at 16 years old he made 8 appearances alongside Sir Alex Ferguson. He studied at The Scottish School of Physical Education with Craig Brown and Andy Roxburgh. During this time he gained his full SFA coaching badge and was a staff coach in 1963. That year he signed for Montrose to play alongside Gordon Wallace.

Gilroy then joined Clyde managed by John Prentice, playing with Jim McLean, Harry Hood and Davie White and 44 goals in 106 games saw him sign for Fulham where he joined Johnny Haynes, George Cohen and Allan Clark. John Prentice signed Gilroy for Dundee to again link up with Gordon Wallace and Jim McLean. After three seasons he joined Highlands Park in South Africa to help win the league and the National Castle Cup. Returning to Scotland he was appointed coach of Falkirk with John Prentice as Manager. Gilroy then managed Valur in Iceland, Morton and Queen's Park before emigrating to Australia. There he managed Brisbane Lions and Brisbane City in the National League then coached the Queensland Team until 1997.

Honours 
Player
Highlands Park
NFL Championship: Runners-up: 1973
NFL Cup: 1973

Manager
Brisbane Lions
NSL Cup: 1981

Individual
Clyde FC Hall of Fame: 2014 InducteeInducted as part of the 1966–67 Clyde squad.

References

External links
 

Living people
1941 births
Scottish footballers
Queen's Park F.C. players
Montrose F.C. players
Clyde F.C. players
Fulham F.C. players
Dundee F.C. players
Highlands Park F.C. players
Greenock Morton F.C. managers
Queen's Park F.C. managers
Greenock Morton F.C. non-playing staff
Expatriate football managers in Iceland
Scottish expatriates in Iceland
Scottish Football League managers
English Football League players
Scottish Football League players
Scottish football managers
Scottish expatriate football managers
Association football forwards
Footballers from Glasgow